Whitehaven Historic District is a national historic district in Whitehaven, Wicomico County, Maryland. It is located at the end of Whitehaven Road (an extension of Maryland Route 352) on the north bank of the Wicomico River. The Whitehaven Ferry that crosses the river here has been in continuous operation since 1688 or earlier. The district encompasses a late-19th century village, consisting of the Whitehaven Hotel, church, school, marine railway, and 24 houses dating from the 19th century, two 20th century and one 18th century dwellings. It is one of the oldest towns in this part of Maryland, authorized by the General Assembly in the late 17th century.

It was added to the National Register of Historic Places in 1980.

References

External links

, including photo dated 1978, at Maryland Historical Trust
Boundary Map of the Whitehaven Historic District, Wicomico County, at Maryland Historical Trust

Historic districts in Wicomico County, Maryland
Federal architecture in Maryland
Victorian architecture in Maryland
Historic districts on the National Register of Historic Places in Maryland
National Register of Historic Places in Wicomico County, Maryland
Whitehaven, Maryland